In Return (CD + EP/10") is the second release by American stoner metal band Torche. It was released on September 18, 2007 through Robotic Empire in the United States and Rock Action Records in Europe on October 15. Artwork and design were created by Baroness singer John Dyer Baizley.

Track listing

Personnel
Steve Brooks – guitar and vocals
Juan Montoya – guitar
Jonathan Nuñez – bass
Rick Smith – drums

Production
John Dyer Baizley – artwork and design
Daniel Escauriza – recording
Jonathan Nuñez – recording

References 

Torche albums
2007 EPs
Albums with cover art by John Dyer Baizley